Shaheed Bir Uttam Lt Anwar Girls' College (Bengali: শহিদ বীর-উত্তম লে. আনোয়ার গার্লস কলেজ) is an educational institution in Dhaka Cantonment, Dhaka, Bangladesh. It is managed by Bangladesh Army and primarily for the children of Army personnel. But students from the civilian section also can study in this college.

History 
On January 1957 the  school was established under Dhaka Cantonment Board as a primary school for the children of defence personnel. The school was renamed to Cantonment Girls School and upgraded to High School.

The school was re-named after Lt. Md Anwar Hossain, who was killed in action in Jessore Cantonment during the Bangladesh Liberation War and received Bir Uttam gallantry award, in 1972. It was upgraded into a college in 1990.

In April 2012, Concord Group awarded scholarships to students from the top ten schools in Dhaka including Shaheed Bir Uttam Lt. Anwar Girls School & College.

The school started Taekwondo classes in 2013 in partnership with the Bangladesh Taekwondo Federation.

The school participated in the National Debate Festival '14. It also participated in the IGNITE competition organized by The Daily Star and Grameenphone.

In January 2016, after the Government of Bangladesh increased the fees of some public schools in Dhaka including Shaheed Bir Uttam Lt. Anwar Girls School & College the parents protested in the street. The government subsequently stopped the fee hike.

Shaheed Bir Uttam Lt. Anwar Girls School & College had a 99.86 per cent pass rate in 2017 in Higher Secondary School Certificate examination.

In 2018, the Shaheed Bir Uttam Lt. Anwar Girls School & College had a high school pass rate of 99.52 per cent, one of the highest.

In 2022, Shaheed Anwar Girls college won the Inter-cantonment English Debate Competition in the college category and were runners-up in the school category.

Alumni 

 Nusraat Faria
 Azmeri Haque Badhon
 Nishat Majumdar

References 

Educational Institutions affiliated with Bangladesh Army
1957 establishments in East Pakistan
Schools in Dhaka District
Colleges in Dhaka District